= Philip Larkin: Life, Art and Love =

2014 book by James Booth

- Author: James Booth
- Language: English
- Subject: Philip Larkin
- Genre: Biography
- Publisher: Bloomsbury
- Publication date: 2014

Philip Larkin: Life, Art and Love is a book by James Booth about the poet Philip Larkin. The book was first published in 2014.
